Aleviz is the Russian name for two Italian architects who worked in Muscovy:

Aloisio da Milano, active from 1494 to 1519
Aloisio the New, active from 1504 to 1517 

ru:Алевиз